Jesse van de Polder (born 3 July 1998) is a Dutch handball player who plays as goalkeeper for Danish club EH Aalborg.

On 5 May 2020, it was announced that she had signed a 1-year contract with EH Aalborg, from TuS Metzingen.

Achievements
Bundesliga:
Bronze Medalist: 2019
DHB-Pokal:
Bronze Medalist: 2018, 2019

References

1998 births
Living people
Dutch female handball players
21st-century Dutch women